Turhan Yaşar Erdoğan (1 January 1938, Tarsus – 4 January 2019, in Ankara) was a Turkish academic in civil engineering.

He graduated from Tarsus American Highschool in 1957. He completed his MS studies in the Civil Engineering Department of the Middle East Technical University (METU) in 1963, and PhD Thesis in the University of Berkeley and METU in 1970.

He continued in METU as an academic. He became assistant professor in 1971, associate professor in 1975 and   professor in 1981. His field of study was construction materials. Although he retired in 2005, he continued as a part time professor in METU till his death. He was laid to rest in Karşıyaka Cemetery.
Turhan Erdoğan was the father of two sons; Selim and Sinan.

Books
He wrote a number of books both in Turkish and in English
Beton (“Concrete”)
Basic Materials of Construction
Materials Science
Materials of Construction
Bağlayıcı Malzemelerin ve Batonun Onbin Yıllık Tarihi (“Ten thousand years-History of Concrete and Binding Materials”)

References

1938 births
People from Tarsus, Mersin
Tarsus American College alumni
Middle East Technical University alumni
University of California, Berkeley alumni
Turkish engineering academics
Academic staff of Middle East Technical University
2019 deaths
Burials at Karşıyaka Cemetery, Ankara
Turkish civil engineers